The National Union of Independents (UNI) was a political party in the Republic of Upper Volta led by Moussa Kargougou.

History
The UNI was established in 1973 as a breakaway from the African Democratic Rally. Although it was banned in 1974 following a military coup, it was revived prior to the 1978 parliamentary elections, with Kargougou having been appointed as Foreign Minister in 1977.

The party received 7% of the vote in the elections, winning a single seat, which was taken by Kargougou.

References

Defunct political parties in Burkina Faso
Political parties established in 1973